Vera Selby  (13 March 1930 – 13 March 2023) was an English snooker and billiards player who won multiple women's world titles in both sports. She won the inaugural World Women's Snooker Championship in 1976 and won the title for a second time in 1981; she also won eight World Women's Billiards Championships from 1970 to 1978. A commentator for the BBC's televised snooker coverage, most notably at the 1982 World Snooker Championship, she was also a qualified referee and coach. 

Remembered as a pioneering figure in women's cue sports, Selby received an MBE in the 2015 Birthday Honours for her services to snooker and billiards.

Career
Selby was introduced to billiards as a six-year-old, as her uncle had a table in the cellar of his home in Newcastle. When she was 36, former British amateur billiards and snooker champion Alf Nolan saw her playing with her husband at the Coxlodge Club in Newcastle and started coaching her. She won eight World Women's Billiards Championships from 1970 to 1978.

In 1976, she became the inaugural winner of the World Women's Snooker Championship, claiming the title by beating Muriel Hazeldine 4–0 in the final. She won her second women's world snooker title in 1981 by defeating Mandy Fisher 3–0 in the final. At 51, her success made her the oldest female world champion in any sport.

A commentator for televised snooker, she was part of the BBC commentary team for the 1982 World Snooker Championship at the Crucible Theatre, at which Alex Higgins won his second world title. She was a qualified referee and coach, and chaired the North East Billiards and Snooker Association. She won a lifetime achievement award for her services to billiards in 2014.

In the 2015 Birthday Honours, she was appointed Member of the Order of the British Empire (MBE) "for services to Snooker and Billiards." She received her MBE from Prince Charles (now Charles III) at Buckingham Palace. At age 85, she was still playing cue sports regularly.

Personal life
Vera Danby was born in Richmond, North Yorkshire, where her father was manager of the Freeman, Hardy and Willis shop. She studied art and design at Leeds University. In her mid-20s, she met Bruce Selby, a hairdresser from Newcastle, who was 28 years her senior. They married two years later.

She worked as a senior art, textile, and dress designer lecturer at the former Newcastle Polytechnic. She took early retirement at 53.

In 2009, she became the Master of the 400-year-old Fellmongers' Guild in Richmond, the first female Master in its history.

Selby died on 13 March 2023, her 93rd birthday. Professional player Shaun Murphy paid tribute, calling her "one of the pioneers of women's snooker and an early trailblazer for girls and women who followed".

Titles and achievements

Snooker

Billiards

Notes

References

External links
 Reanne Evans and Vera Selby on Ladies Day (2016) YouTube video.

1930 births
2023 deaths
English snooker players
Female snooker players
English players of English billiards
Female players of English billiards
People from Richmond, North Yorkshire
Alumni of the University of Leeds
Academics of Northumbria University
Members of the Order of the British Empire